Yim-hing Law is a former Chinese actress and Cantonese opera singer from Hong Kong. Law is credited with over 330 films.

Early life 
In 1929, Law was born in Guangdong Province, China.

Career 
At age 10, Law began training in Cantonese opera from Sit Kok-sin. In 1948, Law crossed over as an actress in Hong Kong films. By age 19, Law first appeared in Five Rascals in the Eastern Capital (Part 1), a 1948 Martial Arts film directed by Wong Hok-Sing. With Law's martial arts skills, she appeared as a lead actress in many Martial Arts films. Law appeared as Lady Knight Red-Garbed in Thirteen Heroes with Seven Swords (Part 1 and Part 2), a 1949 Martial Arts film directed by Ku Wen-Chung. Law also appeared with Yam Kim-fai in many films, including Playboy Emperor, a 1953 Historic Drama Musical film directed by Ku Wen-Chung and How Di Qing and the 5 Tigers Conquered the West, a 1962 Cantonese opera film directed by Chu Kei. Law's last film as a lead is The Sword that Vanquished the Monster, a 1969 Martial Arts film directed by Wu Pang. Law's last film is Love Me and Dad, a 1988 Drama film directed by Stephen Shin Gei-Yin. Law is one of the 'Eight Peonies'. Law is credited with over 330 films.

Repertoire 
 Two Heroic Families
 Power and Dilemma
 The Villain, The General and the Heroic Beauty
 Danfeng fei lin ye he jia
 Feng liu tian zi
 Pi pa xue ran han gong hua

Filmography

Films 
This is a partial list of films.
 1948 Rascals in the Eastern Capital (Part 1) 
 1949 Thirteen Heroes with Seven Swords (Part 1 and Part 2)
 1953 Playboy Emperor 
 1955 Punish the Unfaithful – Kam Yuk-lo 
 1957 Romance of Jade Hall (Part 1) (aka My Kingdom for a Husband) – The Queen 
 1958 The Beauty Who Lived Through Great Changes (aka True Love) 
 1959 Beauty Slain by the Sword 
 1959 Story of the White-Haired Demon Girl (Part 1) 
 1960 An Ancient Bride 
 1960 The Marriage of the Beautiful Corpse
 1960 Silly Wong Growing Rich
 1960 The Stubborn Generations - Leung Yu-Chu.
 1960 Three Females - Leung Kit-Yu.
 1961 The Chilly River Pass – Fan Lei-Fa 
 1962 How Di Qing and the 5 Tigers Conquered the West – Tik Ching and Princess Sheung Yeung 
 1963 Poor Lady Ping (aka Tragic Love of Ping Kei) – Bai Ping-kei 
 1964 Filial Sons and Grandchildren (aka Our Family) – wife 
 1967 The Butterfly Legend  - Chow Yan, the male lead (aka Zhou Ren in Qinqiang The Supreme Sacrifice by Zhou Ren) 
 1967 The Seven Swords and the Thirteen Heroes (aka Seven Knights and Thirteen Chivalrous Men) 
 1969 The Sword that Vanquished the Monster

Theater Performance

Passing of Sit Kok Sin in 1956 
Time To Go Home
The Marriage of the Top Scholar
The Dream Encounter Between Emperor Wu of Han and Lady Wa
With Leung So-Kam as second lead actress

July 1957 
Lady White  Snake, with Ho-Kau Chan as second lead actress
Queen of the Stage (aka Marriage Is a Life-Long Business)

Law pointed out the selflessness of all lead actors with seniority in the Sit clan because she was the lead actress sharing the limelight with the most junior student of Sit, not withstanding the lack of experience, market value or contribution in the events.

Close-knit culture is still the tradition upheld by all today in this entertainment business generally. By that, students are awarded roles/opportunities in the performances of own masters/teachers/parents without proving their abilities to financial backers or organizing committee in those publicly funded events.

In return, the said junior student was expected to be grateful for being given an opportunity as the center of such attention to debut on stage. That junior student of Sit did not talk about this flopped debut or reprise those roles/titles.

Discography 
 RLP 2001, 1966, Two Heroic Families

Personal life 
Law's husband was Ho Fei-Fan (1919–1980), an actor.

References

External links 
 PDF The ‘biographical notes' from www.filmarchive.gov.hk
 
 
 Law Yim-Hing at dianying.com
 Law Yim Hing at hkcinemagic.com

1929 births
Hong Kong Cantonese opera actresses
Hong Kong film actresses
Living people